Sarah Laszloffy was a Republican member of the Montana Legislature. She was elected to House District 53 which represents the Billings area.

Laszloffy served as a Majority Whip of the House during the 2015-2016 session. She was also chair of the Education Committee.

References 

Year of birth missing (living people)
Living people
Republican Party members of the Montana House of Representatives
People from Yellowstone County, Montana
Place of birth missing (living people)